Rajendra Kumar Rai (Nepali: राजेन्द्र कुमार राई) is a Nepalese politician, belonging to the CPN (Unified Socialist)  currently serving as the chief minister of Province No. 1.

Electoral history

2017 Nepalese provincial elections, Bhojpur 1(A)

See also
 CPN (Unified Socialist)

References

External links

Chief Ministers of Nepalese provinces

Communist Party of Nepal (Unified Socialist) politicians
Living people
Rai people
1970 births

 

Members of the Provincial Assembly of Koshi Province